The 2011 Ginetta Junior Championship season was the ninth season of the Ginetta Junior Championship series for junior drivers aged 14 to 17.  The series was based in the United Kingdom and gives aspiring racing drivers aged between 14 and 17 the chance to take their first steps up the motor racing ladder.

The 2011 season commenced on 3 April 2011 at Brands Hatch and concluded on 16 October 2011 at Silverstone, after twenty races to be held at ten meetings in support of the 2011 British Touring Car Championship.

Teams and drivers

Race calendar and results
All rounds were held in the United Kingdom. The series supported the British Touring Car Championship at all rounds.

Standings

References

External links
 Ginetta Junior Championship Official website

Ginetta Junior Championship season
Ginetta Junior Championship seasons